Boswell is a British family name of Norman origins and may refer to the following individuals:

Alexander Boswell (judge) (1706–1782), judge of the Scottish supreme court and father of James Boswell
Alexander Boswell (songwriter) (1775–1822), Scottish songwriter, son of James Boswell, grandson of Alexander Boswell
Sir Alexander Boswell (1928–2021), British lieutenant general.
Bobby Boswell (born 1983), American soccer player
Charles Boswell (1886–1956), New Zealand politician
Chris Boswell (born 1991), American football kicker
Christina Boswell (born 1972), Professor of politics
Claud Irvine Boswell (1742–1824), Scottish judge
Dave Boswell (baseball player) (1945–2012), American baseball player
Edward Boswell (1760–1842), English antiquarian and solicitor
Eric Boswell (songwriter) (1921–2009), English songwriter
Eric J. Boswell (born 1945), United States Assistant Secretary of State for Diplomatic Security
Eve Boswell (1922–1998), Hungarian-born singer in South Africa and Britain
Granny Boswell (c. 1817–1909), Cornish Gypsy
Ian Boswell (born 1991), American road cyclist
James Boswell (1740–1795), Scottish lawyer, diarist, author, and biographer of Samuel Johnson
James Griffin Boswell  (1882–1952), American businessman
John Boswell of Balmuto (1546-1610), Scottish landowner
John Boswell (1947–1994), American historian and Yale professor
Ken Boswell (born 1946), American baseball player
Ken Boswell (rower) (1912–1984), New Zealand rower
Leonard Boswell (1934–2018), American politician
Lewis Archer Boswell (1834–1909), aviation pioneer 
Mark Boswell (athlete) (born 1977), Canadian athlete
Merideth Boswell, American set decorator and production designer
Paul P. Boswell (1905–1982), American physician and politician
Ron Boswell (born 1940), Australian politician
Scott Boswell (born 1974), English cricketer
Stewart Boswell (born 1978), Australian squash player
Thomas Boswell (born 1947), Washington Post sports columnist
Tim Boswell (born 1942), British politician
The Boswell Sisters, American singers and sisters Martha (1905–1958), Connee (1907–1976) and Helvetia (1911–1988)
The Boswell family, a Gypsy family
William Boswell (disambiguation), multiple people

See also
 Buswell (surname)

Scottish surnames